Vladimir Burlakov (born 22 July 1987) is a German actor of Russian descent, known for his portrayal of Thomas Posimski in Deutschland 83 and Deutschland 86.

Biography
Burlakov was born in Moscow, Russian SFSR, Soviet Union (now Russia). In 1996, he and his family moved to Germany. From 2006 to 2010 he studied at Otto Falckenberg School of the Performing Arts.

In November 2021, he came out as gay. He has a partner.

Filmography

Films
 (2012)
Bright Nights (2017)
Iron Sky: The Coming Race (2019) as Sasha

Television
Im Angesicht des Verbrechens (2010)
SOKO Stuttgart (2011), single episode
Der Kriminalist (2011)
Der letzte Bulle (2013), single episode
Wilsberg (2013), single episode
Deutschland 83 (2015) as Thomas Posimski
SOKO Köln (2015), single episode
Deutschland 86 (2018) as Thomas Posimski
Lore (2018), single episode (S2E3)
Beat (2018), recurring
Tatort, single episodes in 2016 and 2018, since 2020 main cast as Leo Hölzer
 Kleo as Andi Wolf (2022)

References

External links

1987 births
Russian emigrants to Germany
Living people
German gay actors
German male film actors
German male television actors